The 2022 United States House of Representatives elections in Oregon were held on November 8, 2022, to elect the six U.S. representatives from the state of Oregon, one from each of the state's six congressional districts. Primaries for these seats were held on May 17, 2022. The elections coincided with the elections and primaries of other federal and state offices.

District boundaries were redrawn to ensure that the districts are apportioned based on data from the 2020 United States census, which added a sixth seat to Oregon's delegation. Democrats won the new sixth district, but Republicans gained Oregon's fifth district, leaving the Congressional delegation with a 4 to 2 party split in favor of the Democrats. This was the first time since 1994 that Republicans won more than one House seat in Oregon.

District 1

From 2012 to 2020, the 1st district was located in northwestern Oregon and included the western Portland metro area, including the Portland suburbs of Beaverton and Hillsboro, and parts of Portland west of the Willamette River. The district was kept largely the same despite redistricting, exchanging Yamhill County for Tillamook County and taking in more of Portland. The incumbent is Democrat Suzanne Bonamici, who was re-elected with 64.6% of the vote in 2020.

Democratic primary

Candidates

Nominee
Suzanne Bonamici, incumbent U.S. Representative

Eliminated in primary 
Scott Phillips
Christian Robertson

Endorsements

Results

Republican primary

Candidates

Nominee
Christopher Mann

Eliminated in primary 
Armidia "Army" Murray, former UPS worker and candidate for this seat in 2020

Results

Independents

Candidates

General election

Predictions

Results

District 2

From 2012 to 2020, the 2nd district was the largest of Oregon's districts and covered roughly two-thirds of the state east of the Cascades, encompassing the central, eastern, and southern regions of the state, including Bend and Medford. The district was kept mostly the same during redistricting, but it did lose Bend to the 5th district and Hood River County to the 3rd, while taking in all of Josephine County and about half of Douglas County. The incumbent is Republican Cliff Bentz, who was elected with 59.9% of the vote in 2020.

Republican primary

Candidates

Nominee 
Cliff Bentz, incumbent U.S. Representative

Eliminated in primary 
Mark Cavener, producer and nonprofit executive
Katherine Gallant, political commentator

Endorsements

Results

Democratic primary

Candidates

Nominee
Joseph Yetter III, retired U.S. Army colonel, physician and farmer

Eliminated in primary
Adam Prine, farmhand

Results

General election

Predictions

Results

District 3

From 2012 to 2020, the 3rd district encompassed the eastern Portland metro area, covering Portland and Gresham. The district was kept largely the same despite redistricting, though it did take in Hood River County, and lost some of Portland to the 1st district. The incumbent is Democrat Earl Blumenauer, who was re-elected with 73.0% of the vote in 2020.

Democratic primary

Candidates

Nominee
Earl Blumenauer, incumbent U.S. Representative

Eliminated in primary
Jonathan E. Polhemus

Endorsements

Results

Republican primary

Candidates

Nominee
Joanna Harbour, attorney and nominee for this district in 2020

Results

General election

Predictions

Results

District 4

From 2012 to 2020, the 4th district included the southern Willamette Valley and the South Coast, including Eugene, Corvallis, and Roseburg. The district was kept largely the same despite redistricting, though it did gain parts of the central coast previously in the 5th district, making the district more Democratic leaning. The incumbent, Democrat Peter DeFazio, who was re-elected with 51.5% of the vote in 2020, has decided to retire, rather than seek a 19th consecutive term in Congress.

Democratic primary

Candidates

Nominee
Val Hoyle, Oregon Commissioner of Labor

Eliminated in primary
Sami Al-Abdrabbuh, chair of the Corvallis School District Board
Doyle Canning, environmental activist and candidate for this district in 2020
Andrew Kalloch, Airbnb senior global policy advisor
Steve Laible, author and publisher
Jake Matthews, community organizer and author
John Selker, professor and scientist
G. Tommy Smith, personal banker

Withdrew
Kevin Easton, political consultant and former executive director of Equity Foundation
Joshua Welch, teacher

Declined
Melissa Cribbins, Coos County commissioner
Peter DeFazio, incumbent U.S. Representative
Julie Fahey, state representative from the 14th district (running for re-election)
Sara Gelser Blouin, state senator from the 8th district (running for re-election)
James Manning Jr., state senator from the 7th district (running for re-election)
Dan Rayfield, Speaker of the Oregon House of Representatives from the 16th district (running for re-election)
Marty Wilde, state representative from the 11th district

Endorsements

Polling

Results

Republican primary

Candidates

Nominee
Alek Skarlatos, former Oregon National Guard soldier and nominee for this district in 2020

Withdrew
Jeremy Van Tress

Results

General election

Predictions

Polling

Results

District 5

From 2012 to 2020, the 5th district straddled the central coast, and included Salem and the southern Portland suburbs. The new 5th district keeps the southern suburbs of Portland and reaches further into the city, but does not include any coastline, instead stretching southwards through the eastern parts of Marion and Linn counties to Bend. 

The incumbent, Democrat Kurt Schrader, was re-elected with 51.9% of the vote in 2020. He lost renomination to Jamie McLeod-Skinner.

Democratic primary

Candidates

Nominee
Jamie McLeod-Skinner, attorney, former Santa Clara, California city councillor, nominee for the 2nd district in 2018, and candidate for Oregon Secretary of State in 2020

Eliminated in primary
Kurt Schrader, incumbent U.S. Representative

Withdrew
Mark Gamba, Mayor of Milwaukie (endorsed McLeod-Skinner)

Endorsements

Polling

Results

Republican primary

Candidates

Nominee
Lori Chavez-DeRemer, former Mayor of Happy Valley

Eliminated in primary
John Di Paola, orthopedic surgeon
Laurel L. Roses, co-owner of a trucking company
Madison Oatman, building restoration technician

Declined
Shelly Boshart Davis, state representative from the 15th district (running for re-election)
Knute Buehler, nominee for Governor of Oregon in 2018
Christine Drazan, former Minority Leader of the Oregon House of Representatives from the 39th dsitrict (running for governor)
Cheri Helt, former state representative from the 54th district (running for labor commissioner)
Tim Knopp, Minority Leader of the Oregon State Senate from the 27th district
Tootie Smith, Clackamas County commissioner

Endorsements

Results

General election

Predictions

Endorsements

Polling 

Generic Democrat vs. generic Republican

Results

District 6

The 6th district was created following the 2020 census. It consists of Polk County and Yamhill County, in addition to portions of Marion County (including the state capital, Salem), Clackamas County, and Washington County.

Democratic primary

Candidates

Nominee
Andrea Salinas, state representative from the 38th district

Eliminated in primary
Teresa Alonso Leon, state representative from the 22nd district
Ricky Barajas, perennial candidate
Carrick Flynn, former Oxford researcher on pandemic preparedness
Kathleen Harder, chair of the Oregon Medical Board
Greg Goodwin
Cody Reynolds, businessman and veteran
Loretta Smith, former Multnomah County commissioner
Matt West, engineer at Intel

Withdrew
Brian Hylland Jr.
Derry Jackson, former Portland Public Schools board member

Declined
Brian Clem, former state representative from the 21st district
Paul Evans, state representative from the 20th district and former Mayor of Monmouth (running for re-election)

Endorsements

Polling

Results

Republican primary

Candidates

Nominee

Eliminated in primary
Jim Bunn, former U.S. Representative for 
Ron Noble, state representative from the 24th district
Angela Plowhead, clinical psychologist
David Russ, Mayor of Dundee
Nate Sandvig, U.S. Military Academy graduate

Declined
Tootie Smith, Clackamas County commissioner

Endorsements

Results

General election

Predictions

Endorsements

Polling 
Aggregate polls

Graphical summary

Generic Democrat vs. generic Republican

Results

Notes

Partisan clients

References

External links
Official campaign websites for 1st district candidates
Suzanne Bonamici (D) for Congress 

Official campaign websites for 2nd district candidates
Cliff Bentz (R) for Congress
Joseph Yetter III (D) for Congress

Official campaign websites for 3rd district candidates
Earl Blumenauer (D) for Congress
Joanna Harbour (R) for Congress

Official campaign websites for 4th district candidates
 Val Hoyle (D) for Congress
 Alek Skarlatos (R) for Congress

Official campaign websites for 5th district candidates
 Lori Chavez-DeRemer (R) for Congress
 Jamie McLeod-Skinner (D) for Congress

Official campaign websites for 6th district candidates
 Mike Erickson (R) for Congress
 Andrea Salinas (D) for Congress

2022
Oregon
United States House of Representatives